Project Stealth is a cancelled stealth multiplayer video game. The game's design is inspired by the multiplayer component found in the Tom Clancy's Splinter Cell games of Pandora Tomorrow and Chaos Theory.

Project Stealth has received several awards and recognition while under development from several gaming mod-based websites and PC Gamer magazine. On May 23, 2014, the developers started a crowd funding campaign through Kickstarter in order to raise funds to complete development. However, the funding campaign failed because the goal was not reached, and months later the game has been officially confirmed cancelled.

Gameplay

The gameplay will consist of two teams with two players on each team. The defending team, the Mercenaries, play from a first-person shooter perspective while the infiltrating team, the Spies, play in a third-person view to aid in increasing situational awareness. Both teams have access to a variety of unique weapons and gadgets to aid them in their mission.

Spies

Spies play like a third-person shooter. This gives them the advantage of better reconnaissance abilities. Their objective is usually to hack certain terminals. At the start of the match the Spies are spawned and have to infiltrate the map, which is guarded by the Mercenaries and their usually deadly gadgets. Spies have a strictly non-lethal armory, and only method of killing is to sneak up behind a Mercenary and grab him. Therefore, it is usually preferable to avoid fighting the Mercenaries, and instead focus on the objectives.

Mercenaries
Mercenaries have a whole arsenal of gadgets and deadly weapons in order to complete their objective: guarding the terminals and preventing Spies from getting into the premises. They are aided by a gun, which can be a rifle with sniping capabilities, a shotgun for close-range and an SMG for medium range.

Reception
Project Stealth was voted into the Top-100 of ModDb's Mod of the Year 2007 Awards. and the IndieDb's Indie of the Year 2010 Awards.

References

External links

 Project Stealth, IndieDB webpage
 
 Project Stealth fund tracking at Kicktraq.com

First-person shooters
Cancelled Windows games
Cooperative video games
Freeware games
Multiplayer video games
Stealth video games
Third-person shooters
Unreal Engine games
Crowdfunding projects